Synchaetidae is a family of rotifers belonging to the order Ploima.

Genera:
 Bipalpus Herrick, 1885
 Ploesoma Herrick, 1885
 Polyarthra Ehrenberg, 1834
 Pseudoploesoma Myers, 1938
 Synchaeta Ehrenberg, 1832

References

Ploima
Rotifer families